Muhammad Abdi Yusuf (born 1 July 1941) was the Prime Minister of Somalia from November 8, 2003 to November 1, 2004.

Biography
Yusuf was born in 1941 in the former Italian Somaliland. He hails from Awrtable subclan of Darod. Yusuf was appointed Prime Minister on December 8, 2003 by then President of Somalia, Abdiqasim Salad Hassan. Yusuf left office on November 3, 2004, when Somalia's new President Abdullahi Yusuf Ahmed replaced him with Ali Muhammad Ghedi.

Notes

Living people
1941 births
21st-century prime ministers of Somalia